The 2018 AVP Pro Beach Volleyball Tour is a domestic professional beach volleyball circuit organized in the United States by the Association of Volleyball Professionals (AVP) for the 2018 beach volleyball season. The 2018 AVP Tour calendar comprises a joint AVP-FIVB tournament, the "Gold Series" tournaments and the "Open" tournaments.

Schedule

This is the complete schedule of events on the 2018 calendar, with team progression documented from the semifinals stage. All tournaments consisted of single-elimination qualifying rounds followed by a double-elimination main draw.
Key

Men

Women

Milestones and events
Miscellaneous
AVP and Amazon signed an agreement to livestream almost every match from every AVP tournament on Amazon Prime for the next three seasons, starting with the 2018 season.

Points distribution

Awards
The 2018 AVP Awards Banquet was held on November 15 in Newport Beach, California. The season's top performers were chosen based on statistics, player votes and AVP national ranking points earned during the year.

References

Association of Volleyball Professionals
AVP Pro Beach Volleyball Tour